The 1943–44 League of Ireland was the 23rd season of senior football in the Republic of Ireland. Cork United were the two-time defending champions.

Changes from 1942–43 
Two teams failed to be re-elected: Bray Unknowns and Brideville, resulting in a reduction in size from ten to eight.

No new teams were elected in their place.

Teams

Season overview
Shelbourne won their fourth title.

Standings

Results

Top goalscorers

See also 
 1943–44 FAI Cup

Ireland
Lea
League of Ireland seasons